Kurdistan Freedom Party (abbreviated as PAK) is a Kurdish nationalist and separatist militant group of Kurds in Iran, based in northern Iraq.

The group has declared creation of an independent Kurdish country as its main aim.

History 
The group was founded by Said Yazdanpanah, a former member of the People's Fedai Guerrillas, in May 1991, as the Revolutionaries' Union of Kurdistan. Said Yazdanpanah was killed in September 1991, and his brother Hussein Yazdanpanah took over the organization afterwards. 

In a congress held between 10–12 October 2006 in Erbil, the group adopted its current name and named Ali Qazi, the son of Qazi Mohammad, as its leader. Yazdanpanah became Vice President. A few months later, the group experienced a split when some members led by Simko Yazdanpanah, the brother of the group's leaders left the party on 7 July 2007. They declared on 12 August that they have reorganized the original Revolutionaries' Union of Kurdistan, and their leader is Amine Khanim, mother of Yazdanpanah brothers.

As of 2017, the organization maintains close ties to the Democratic Party of Iranian Kurdistan (KDPI) and is on friendly terms with both Kurdistan Democratic Party (KDP) and Patriotic Union of Kurdistan (PUK).

Armed activities 

These Peshmerga have been involved in the War in Iraq between 2014-2017, fighting the Islamic State along with other Kurdish forces. They received training from US forces during their struggle against ISIL in Kirkuk, where they played a crucial role. Some members of the Kurdistan Freedom Party also travelled to Syria and helped to defend Kobanî against ISIL.

In April 2016, PAK attacked Iranian government security forces in Sanandaj during the annual Islamic Republic of Iran Army Day parade, ending its cease-fire and resume its armed struggle.

Strength
In December 2019, Hussein Yazdanpanah said there are 1,000 members in his group, however there is no independent verification for this claim. A 2017 report published by Combating Terrorism Center estimated that the group has "a few hundred" members, the same figure reported by AP in the previous year. In 2016, Voice of America wrote that the group has some 600 fighters, one-third of whom female. PAK welcomed some foreign fighters from Scandinavia during its campaign against ISIL.

Equipment
The PAK members wear uniforms similar to the fighters under command of Peshmerga ministry, but install their own patches too. They use a variety of weapons, including Russian-made equipment. AK-47 is a regular weapon of PAK fighters. Journalist Fazel Hawramy wrote in 2017 that PAK uses weapons supplied by Combined Joint Task Force – Operation Inherent Resolve. The organization has denied being armed by the Americans.

Ideology
The group espouses Kurdish nationalism and is regarded as politically left-leaning on the political spectrum.

State sponsorship
In July 2016, PAK declared that international aid will help them cease "Iranian influence in the region". They directly asked Saudi Arabia for funding, according to Stratfor analyses, which may have been accepted. In September 2016, PAK announced that it has received military training in weapons and explosives from the United States.

References

1991 establishments in Iraqi Kurdistan
Anti-ISIL factions in Iraq
Banned Kurdish parties
Banned political parties in Iran
Kurdish nationalism in Iran
Kurdish nationalist political parties
Kurdish political parties in Iran
Kurdish separatism in Iran
Left-wing militant groups in Iran
Militant opposition to the Islamic Republic of Iran
Organisations designated as terrorist by Iran
Political parties established in 1991